The Ferguson rifle was one of the first breech-loading rifles to be put into service by the British military. It fired a standard British carbine ball of .615" calibre and was used by the British Army in the American Revolutionary War at the Battle of Brandywine in 1777, and possibly at the Siege of Charleston in 1780.

Its superior firepower was unappreciated at the time because it was too expensive and took longer to produce – the four gunsmiths making Ferguson's Ordnance Rifle could not make 100 in 6 months at four times the cost per arm of a musket.

Details

The breech of the weapon is closed by 11 starting threads on a tapered screw, and the trigger guard serves as the crank to rotate it. One complete turn dropped the screw low enough to drop a round ball into the exposed breech followed by a slight overcharge of powder, which was then sheared to the proper charge by the screw as it closed the breech. Since the weapon was loaded from the breech, rather than from the muzzle, it had an amazingly high rate of fire for its day, and in capable hands, it fired six to ten rounds per minute. To prove the potency of his invention, Patrick Ferguson conducted a series of tests in which he, with a high degree of accuracy, fired 6 shots per minute at a target 200 yards distant from a stationary position, and 4 shots per minute while advancing at a marching pace. He then wet the inside of the barrel, waited another minute, and then fired the weapon again, to prove its reliability regardless of weather conditions.Joseph Cook (editor). "WCDS History Papers."  Lulu: 2014. Page 97.

The action was adapted from the earlier 1720 Isaac de la Chaumette design by Major Patrick Ferguson (1744–1780), who redesigned it around 1770. He received an English patent in December of 1776 (number 1139) on details of the design.

Roughly one hundred of the Ordnance rifles were manufactured by four British gun firms, Durs Egg being the most notable, and issued to Ferguson's unit when its members were drawn from numerous light infantry units in General Howe's army. The largest battle in which the rifles were used was the Battle of Brandywine, in which Ferguson was wounded. While he recuperated, his Experimental Rifle Corps was subsequently disbanded. This was in no way due to "excessive losses" or any political machinations; the unit was an experiment, and the men were always slated to return to their original units.

Ferguson's men went back to the light infantry units they had originally come from, and his rifles were eventually replaced with the standard Long Land Pattern musket. Some historians report the surviving rifles were apparently put in storage in New York. But as most surviving Ferguson Ordnance Rifles known to exist in the U.S. today were spoils of war taken North during the American Civil War, the usage of these weapons remain in dispute as to any possible deployment of Ferguson rifles in the Southern theater of the American Revolutionary War. 

The two main reasons that Ferguson rifles were not used by the rest of the army:
The gun was difficult and expensive to produce using the small, decentralized gunsmith and subcontractor system in use to supply the Ordnance in early Industrial Revolution Britain.
The guns broke down easily in combat, especially in the wood of the stock around the lock mortise. The lock mechanism and breech were larger than the stock could withstand with rough use. All surviving military Fergusons feature a horseshoe-shaped iron repair under the lock to hold the stock together where it repeatedly broke around the weak, over-drilled out mortise.

However, despite an unsubstantiated claim that one of the actions was found at the battle site of Kings Mountain, North Carolina, where Ferguson was killed in action, the only piece of a Ferguson ever found in America from a gun used in action is a trigger guard found in excavations of a British army camp in New York City. The only association the Ferguson rifle has with the Battle of Kings Mountain is that Patrick Ferguson was there.

Experience with early modern replicas, made before the proper screw and thread pitch of the breechblock were rediscovered, seemed to indicate that while reloading was rapid, it seemed to be necessary to first lubricate the breech screw (originally with a mixture of beeswax and tallow) or else the (replica) rifle would foul so much that it needed cleaning after three or four shots. However, through the research efforts of DeWitt Bailey and others, the properly made reproduction Ferguson rifle, made according to Patrick Ferguson's specifications of the 1770s, can fire beyond sixty shots.

In popular culture
The Ferguson Rifle, a book by Louis L'Amour, is not about the rifle specifically, but instead a historical fiction story about someone going out west who was given one of the rifles by Ferguson.
The rifle was used by Dewey Lambdin for his character Alan Lewrie, who picked one up at Yorktown.
The video game Empire: Total War has a unit of "Ferguson Riflemen," which use the Ferguson rifle and are a unique unit recruitable by Great Britain.
In the video game Rise of Liberty, the Ferguson rifle appears as a select-able weapon. In game it reloads realistically, using a breach reloading mechanism. Strangely, it is usable by both the Colonists and the British, despite it only being historically used by the latter.
In the video game GUN a Ferguson rifle is used by Ned White, the father of protagonist Colton White. It is the third of three single-shot rifles overall (the first two being long-range sharpshooter rifles) and the second of two standard rifles acquired in the game, the other being a Winchester 1866 repeater.
In the book On Basilisk Station, the first book of David Weber's Honor Harrington series, an alien firearm is compared to a Ferguson rifle.
The rifle is mentioned several times in Geoffrey Watson's book Nelson's Fighting Cocks.
In the book Like A Mighty Army, the seventh book in David Weber's "Safehold" series, a weapons designer for the antagonist, the established church, invents a Ferguson rifle.
Thomas Keneally's 1967 Miles Franklin-winning novel,  Bring Larks and Heroes, opens with young Corporal Halloran striding through the 'Australian' bush in the early days of convict settlement. "Anyone who knew firearms would take great interest in the musket [sic] he's got in his right hand.  It's a rare model that usually hangs in the company commander's office." Then in chapter 3: "Halloran carried… a breech-loading Ferguson, a wonder of its times, capable of downing three men a minute."
In S2E3 of the Netflix series Frontier the character Declan  Harp and 2 companions are fired upon by a bounty hunter armed with a Ferguson rifle. Charlie, one of the companions, and a slave earlier freed by Harp, identifies the Ferguson rifle by the bounty hunter's high rate of fire and warns Harp of the rifle's 300 yard range. Harp later damages the rifle with a hatchet.
 In H. Beam Piper's parallel universe story "He Walked Around the Horses," the Ferguson breech-loading rifle is mentioned as the primary reason why the British did far better during the American War of Independence than in "our" history, although independence was still achieved. 
 In the book King's Mountain by Sharyn McCrumb the Ferguson Rifle is mentioned in great detail and also the story of its development is told in fairly accurate style. Patrick Ferguson is, of course, a main character in this historical fiction piece, but the historical details are correctly rendered. The Ferguson Rifle is recounted as an emotional catalyst for the actions and frustrations of Patrick Ferguson, and he is mentioned as speaking of the rifle in great frustration. The account of the trial of the gun, and his subsequent injury, is recounted in the book by the character of Ferguson himself. There is a bit of poetic license taken in that Ferguson states that he had the opportunity to shoot George Washington with the gun, but was held back by the man's "aristocratic"  demeanor.
 A Ferguson rifle is carried in "The Stonecroft Saga" by B. N. Rundell, it was collected during the Revolutionary War and carried west.  The breech loading is not well described but the high rate of fire gets the explorers out of a few tight spots.

See also
British military rifles
M1819 Hall rifle (another early breech-loader)

Notes

Further reading
 The Age of Firearms: A Pictorial History: Held, Robert 
 The American Rifleman: NRA Publications, August & September 1971
 "The American Rifle: At the Battle of Kings Mountain", C. P. Russell, Supervisor of Interpretation, Washington. The Regional Review, National Park Service, Region One, Richmond, Va., Vol. V, No. 1, July 1940, pp. 15–21
 An Essay on Shooting: John Acton, 
 Ferguson: A Man and his Rifle, Layton Hillyer Guns and Ammo June 1960
 "Testing the Ferguson Rifle: Modern Marksman Attains High Precision With Arm of 1776*" Dr. Alfred F. Hopkins, formerly Field Curator, Museum Division, Washington. The Regional Review, National Park Service, Region One, Richmond, Va., Vol. VI, Nos. 1 and 2.
 Patrick Ferguson: "A man of some genius": M M Gilchrist 
 Scythmore Wedderburn papers: Scottish National Archives
 Every Insult and Indignity: The Life, Genius and Legacy of Major Patrick Ferguson
 British Military Flintlock Rifles, 1740–1840, by Bruce N. Canfield, Robert L. Lamoreaux, Edward R. Johnson, De Witt Bailey;

External links
 A page maintained by an owner of a replica Ferguson rifle
 An article on the Ferguson rifle, complete with cut away views of the action 
 Fergusson Rifle at Morristown Park Museum (For reference only) 
 Ferguson Rifle at website The Price of Freedom {for reference only}
 Every Insult and Indignity: The Life, Genius and Legacy of Major Patrick Ferguson
 Ferguson rifle

Early rifles
Firearm actions
Firearm components
Scottish inventions
Rifles of the United Kingdom
Single-shot rifles
Weapons and ammunition introduced in 1776